Most is a surname. Some notable people with the surname include:

 Deforrest Most (1917–2006), American gymnast
 Don Most (born 1953), American actor
 Doug Most (born 1968), editor of The Boston Globe Magazine 
 Glenn W. Most (born 1952), American classicist and comparatist 
 Jeff Most (born 1960), American film producer
 Johann Most (1846–1906), German-American anarchist and orator
 Johnny Most (1923–1993), American sports announcer
 Liza van der Most (born 1993), Dutch footballer
 Mickie Most (1938–2003), English record producer
 Sam Most (born 1930), Los Angeles-based jazz flautist and tenor saxophonist

See also
 Most (disambiguation)
German-language surnames